Aidan Fogarty (born 7 June 1958 in Banagher, County Offaly) is an Irish former sportsperson.  He played hurling with his local club St Rynagh's and with the Offaly senior inter-county team from 1977 until 1991.

Playing career

Club

Fogarty played his club hurling with the famous St Rynagh's club in Banagher and experienced much success.  He won his first two senior county titles in 1975 and 1976 while still only a minor.  Fogarty captured another set of back-to-back county medals in 1981 and 1982.  This latter victory was subsequently converted into a Leinster title.  Fogarty won another two county titles in 1987 and 1990, before finishing off his club career by winning another two-in-a-row in 1992 and 1993.  Once again, this latter victory was converted into a second Leinster club title.

Inter-county

Fogarty first came to prominence on the inter-county scene as a member of the Offaly minor hurling team in the mid-1970s.  He played at this level for his native-county in both 1975 and 1976, however, success eluded him on both occasions.  Fogarty later joined the county under-21 team where he did win a Leinster title in 1978.  It was a sign of things to come for Offaly.

By this stage Fogarty had already joined the Offaly senior team.  He made his debut in the 1976-77 National Hurling League, however, Offaly were defeated at the semi-final stages.  In spite of this success was slow in coming in the championship as Fogarty’s side was defeated in 1977, 1978 and 1979.  All this changed in 1980 when Offaly recorded a sensational 3-17 to 5-10 victory over All-Ireland champions Kilkenny in the Leinster final.  Not only was it Fogarty’s first Leinster title but it was also the first time that Offaly had won the provincial title.  Offaly's fairytale season subsequently ended with a defeat by Galway in the All-Ireland semi-final.  Offaly bounced back in 1981 with Fogarty capturing a second consecutive Leinster medal.  This victory allowed Offaly a straight passage into the All-Ireland final where Galway provided the opposition.  Things looked bad for Offaly as the second-half saw Galway take a six-point lead.  The men from the West failed to score for the final 23 minutes of the game, allowing Offaly to capture a 2-12 to 0-15 win.  Fogarty had finally captured his first All-Ireland medal. 

Offaly surrendered their provincial crown to Kilkenny in 1982; however, Fogarty was still presented with his first All-Star award.  Kilkenny remained on top in 1983, however, Offaly bounced back in 1984 to win the Leinster title for the third time.  A facile win over Galway in the All-Ireland semi-final resulted in Offaly being installed as hot favourites to claim their second All-Ireland title.  Cork provided the opposition in the championship decider in the first ever meeting of these two teams.  Offaly's favourites tag turned out to be completely unjustified as Cork swept them off the field on a score line of 3-16 to 1-12. In 1985 Offaly retained their provincial crown, giving Fogarty a fourth Leinster title.  This victory allowed Offaly to advance directly to the All-Ireland final where Galway provided the opposition.  After an exciting game Offaly emerged victorious giving Fogarty a second All-Ireland title.  The next few years saw Kilkenny reclaim the Leinster title, however, Offaly returned to their winning ways in 1988 with Fogarty capturing a fifth Leinster medal.  The subsequent All-Ireland semi-final resulted in a loss for his side.  The following year he added a sixth Leinster medal to his collection, however, the subsequent All-Ireland semi-final produced one of the biggest hurling shocks of all-time.  Antrim came from nowhere to defeat the men from the Faithful County on a score line of 4-15 to 1-15.  The significance of Antrim's victory was not lost on the Offaly team, who provided a guard of honour for the Ulstermen as they left the field.  Fogarty was later presented with a second All-Star award.

In 1990 Fogarty won a seventh Leinster medal, however, defeat soon followed in the All-Ireland semi-final.  1991 began well as Offaly captured their first National League title; however, Fogarty played no part in that victory.  He was recalled for the Leinster championship games against Dublin.  It was his last game for Offaly as he retired immediately after the game.

Provincial

Fogarty has also lined out with Leinster in the Railway Cup inter-provincial competition.  He captured a winners’ medal in this as captain of the side in 1988 as Leinster defeated Connacht.

Post-playing career

In retirement from playing Fogarty has remained involved with the game of hurling.  He moved to County Kilkenny in 1984 and turned his hand to club coaching.  He guided the Kilkenny club O'Loughlin Gaels to their first county title in 2001.

References

1958 births
Living people
St Rynagh's hurlers
Offaly inter-county hurlers
Leinster inter-provincial hurlers
Hurling managers
All-Ireland Senior Hurling Championship winners
Irish salespeople